Musschia aurea, is a species of flowering plant in the Campanulaceae family.

References 

Campanuloideae